The Villisca axe murders occurred between the evening of June 9, 1912, and the early morning of June 10, 1912, in the town of Villisca, Iowa, United States. The six members of the Moore family and two guests were found bludgeoned in the Moore residence. All eight victims, including six children, had severe head wounds from an axe. A lengthy investigation yielded several suspects, one of whom was tried twice. The first trial ended in a hung jury and the second ended in an acquittal. The crime remains unsolved.

Details

The Moore family consisted of parents Josiah B. (aged 43), Sarah (née Montgomery) (39), and their four children: Herman Montgomery (11), Mary Katherine (10), Arthur Boyd (7), and Paul Vernon (5). An affluent family, the Moores were well known and well liked in their community. On June 9, 1912, Mary Katherine Moore invited Ina Mae (8) and Lena Gertrude Stillinger (12) to spend the night at the Moore residence. That evening, the visiting girls and the Moore family attended the Presbyterian church where they participated in the Children's Day Program, which Sarah had coordinated. After the program ended at 9:30 p.m., the Moores and the Stillinger sisters walked to the Moores' house, arriving between 9:45 and 10p.m.

Discovery of the crime  

At 7A.M. the next day, June 10, Mary Peckham, the Moores' neighbor, became concerned after she noticed that the family had not come out to do their morning chores. Peckham knocked on the Moores' door. When nobody answered, she tried to open the door and discovered that it was locked. Peckham let the Moores' chickens out and called Ross Moore, Josiah's brother. Like Peckham, Moore received no response when he knocked on the door and shouted. Ross unlocked the front door with his copy of the house key. While Peckham stood on the porch, Ross went into the parlor and opened the guest bedroom door, where he found Ina and Lena Stillinger's bodies on the bed. Moore immediately told Peckham to call Henry "Hank" Horton, Villisca's primary peace officer, who arrived shortly thereafter. Horton's search of the house revealed that the entire Moore family and the two Stillinger girls had been bludgeoned to death. The murder weapon, an axe belonging to Josiah, was found in the guest room where the Stillinger sisters were found.

Doctors concluded that the murders had taken place between midnight and 5a.m. Two spent cigarettes in the attic suggested that the killer or killers patiently waited (according to the official tour, there were no cigarettes found) 
in the attic until the Moore family and the Stillinger guests were asleep. The killer(s) began in the master bedroom, where Josiah and Sarah Moore were sleeping. Josiah received more blows from the axe than any other victim; his face had been cut to such an extent that his eyes were missing. The ceiling in his room also had a gouge mark from when the murderer lifted the axe to murder him.

The killer or killers used the blade of the axe on Sarah, while using the blunt end on the rest of the victims. Herman, Mary Katherine, Arthur, and Paul were next bludgeoned in the head in the same manner as their parents. Afterwards, the murderer returned to the master bedroom to inflict more blows on the elder Moores, knocking over a shoe that had filled with blood, before moving downstairs to the guest bedroom and killing Ina and Lena. Seemingly afterwards, a 4lb slab of bacon was taken out of the icebox and laid next to the axe. Investigators also found untouched food and bloody water during the search. After the search, people were let in to see if they could have committed the crime, completely contaminating the weapon.

Investigators believed that all of the victims except for Lena Stillinger had been asleep when murdered. They thought that she was awake and tried to fight back, as she was found lying crosswise on the bed, and with a defensive wound on her arm. Lena's nightgown was pushed up to her waist and she was wearing no undergarments, leading to law enforcement speculation that the killer(s) sexually molested her or attempted to do so.

Investigation
Over time, many possible suspects emerged, including Reverend George Kelly, Frank F. Jones, William Mansfield, Loving Mitchell, Paul Mueller and Henry Lee Moore (no relation). Kelly was tried twice for the murder. The first trial ended in a hung jury, while the second ended in an acquittal. Other suspects in the investigation were also exonerated.

Andrew Sawyer
Every transient and otherwise unaccounted-for stranger was a suspect in the murders, Andrew Sawyer was one of those people. He was interrogated but not charged. He also was obsessed with the murders and slept fully clothed as if he was ready to make a clean getaway and he also slept with an axe by his bed.

Reverend George Kelly
Kelly was an English-born traveling minister in town on the night of the murders. Kelly was described as peculiar, reportedly having suffered a mental breakdown as an adolescent. As an adult, he was accused of peeping and several times asking young women and girls to pose nude for him. On June 8, 1912, he came to Villisca to teach at the Children's Day services, which the Moore family attended on June 9, 1912. He left town between 5:00 a.m. and 5:50 a.m. on June 10, 1912, hours before the bodies were discovered. Reverend Kelly had confessed to the murders in court, but the jury didn't believe his confession.

In the weeks that followed, he displayed a fascination with the case and wrote many letters to the police, investigators, and family of the deceased. This aroused suspicion and a private investigator wrote back to Reverend Kelly, asking for details that the minister might know about the murders. Kelly replied with great detail, claiming to have heard sounds and possibly witnessed the murders. His known mental illness made authorities question whether he knew the details because of having committed the murders or was imagining his account.

In 1914, two years after the murders, Kelly was arrested for sending obscene material through the mail (he was sexually harassing a woman who applied for a job as his secretary). He was sent to St. Elizabeth’s Hospital, the national mental hospital in Washington, D.C. Investigators speculated again that Kelly could be the murderer of the Moore family.

In 1917, Kelly was arrested for the Villisca murders. Police obtained a confession from him; however, it followed many hours of interrogation and Kelly later recanted. After two separate trials, he was acquitted.

Frank F. Jones
Frank Fernando Jones was a Villisca resident and an Iowa State Senator. Josiah Moore had worked for Frank Jones at his implement store for many years before leaving to open his own store. Moore reportedly took business away from Jones, including a very successful John Deere dealership. Moore was rumored to have had a sexual affair with Jones’ daughter-in-law, though no evidence supports this.

William Mansfield
Another theory was that Senator Jones hired William "Blackie" Mansfield to murder the Moore family.

Nine months before the murders at Villisca, a similar case of axe murder occurred in Colorado Springs, Colorado. Two axe murder cases followed in Ellsworth, Kansas, and Paola, Kansas. The cases were similar enough to raise the possibility of having been committed by the same person. Other murders reported as possibly being linked to these crimes include the numerous unsolved axe murders along the Southern Pacific Railroad from 1911–1912, the unsolved Axeman of New Orleans killings, as well as several other such murders during this time period.

The murders in Colorado Springs were closely related in execution to those in the Moore house. H.C. Wayne, his wife and child, and Mrs. A.J. Burnham were found dead, murdered with (an) axe/s. Bed sheets were used to cover the windows to prevent passersby from looking in. At the Moore house, the murderer hung aprons and skirts to cover the windows. As in the murders in Villisca, the murderer in Colorado Springs wiped the blood off his axe and covered the heads of the victims with bed clothes.

Mansfield was also the prime suspect of the Burns Detective Agency of Kansas City and Detective James Newton Wilkerson, who suggested that he was a cocaine-addicted serial killer. According to contemporary news reports, Wilkerson believed Mansfield was responsible for the axe murders of his wife, infant child, father-in-law, and mother-in-law in Blue Island, Illinois, on July 5, 1914 (two years after the Villisca murders), the axe murders committed in Paola, Kansas, four days before the Villisca murders, and the murders of Jennie Peterson and Jennie Miller in Aurora, Illinois.

According to Wilkerson's investigation, all of the murders were committed in precisely the same manner, indicating that the same man probably committed them. Wilkerson stated that he could prove that Mansfield was present in each of the differing crime scenes on the night of the murders. In each murder, the victims were hacked to death with an axe and the mirrors in the homes were covered. A burning lamp with the chimney off was left at the foot of the bed and a basin in which the murderer washed was found in the kitchen. In each case, the murderer avoided leaving fingerprints by wearing gloves, which Wilkerson believed was strong evidence that the man was Mansfield, who knew his fingerprints were on file at the federal military prison at Leavenworth.

Wilkerson managed to convince a grand jury to open an investigation in 1916, and Mansfield was arrested and brought to Montgomery County from Kansas City. Payroll records, however, provided an alibi that placed Mansfield in Illinois at the time of the Villisca murders. He was released for a lack of evidence, and later won a lawsuit he brought against Wilkerson, and was awarded $2,225. Wilkerson believed that pressure from Jones resulted not only in Mansfield's release but also in the subsequent arrest and trial of Reverend Kelly.

However, R.H. Thorpe, a restaurant owner from Shenandoah, Iowa, identified Mansfield as the man he saw the morning after the Villisca murders boarding a train at Clarinda. This man said he had walked from Villisca. If proven to be true, this testimony would disprove Mansfield's alibi. Furthermore, it was reported that a Mrs. Vina Tompkins, of Marshalltown, was on her way to testify that she heard three men in the woods plotting the murder of the Moore family a short time before the killings.

Henry Lee Moore

Henry Lee Moore was a suspected serial killer (who was not related to the slain Moore family) who was convicted of the murder of his mother and grandmother several months after the murders in Villisca, his weapon of choice being an axe. Before and after the murders in Villisca, the very similar axe murders on his mother and grandmother were committed, and all of the cases showed striking similarities, leading to strong suspicion that some, or all of the crimes were committed by an axe-murdering serial killer and, just like "Blackie" Mansfield, the axe-murdering Henry Moore can also be considered a suspect in some of these slayings.

Sam Moyer
At the inquest, it was reported that Sam Moyer (Josiah's brother-in-law) often threatened to kill Josiah Moore; however, upon further investigation, Moyer's alibi cleared him of the crime.

Paul Mueller
In their 2017 book The Man from the Train, Bill James and his daughter Rachel McCarthy James discuss the Villisca murders as part of a much larger series of murders which they believe were all committed by a single serial killer. They conclude the murderer was Paul Mueller (or Miller), an immigrant possibly from Germany who was the subject of an unsuccessful yearlong manhunt as the sole suspect in the 1897 murder of a family in West Brookfield, Massachusetts, who had employed him as a farmhand. 

James started his research in an attempt to solve the Villisca murders, and with his daughter found archival newspaper stories detailing dozens of families murdered under similar circumstances across the US. The Jameses thus believe that Mueller was guilty of the Villisca murders as part of a killing spree that lasted over a decade, killing at least 59 people in 14 separate incidents, including the Colorado Springs and Paola crimes. The Jameses identify common features to these crimes, many of which are also found at the Villisca scene. 

The killer selected families who lived near railroad tracks which is why the killer was suspected to have traveled (hence their book's title), seemingly struck in ambush at about midnight while the victims were asleep, used the blunt side of an ax rather than the blade to strike the victims in the head and face, used an ax found at the victim's home and left in plain sight after the murders, covered the victims with blankets to prevent blood spatter, covered windows from inside the house and locked the doors before departure. In Mueller's suspected crimes there was often but not always a sexual motive directed towards a pubescent girl, as with Lena's being partly disrobed. 

In a blurb on the dust jacket of the hardcover edition of The Man from the Train, professor and crime writer Harold Schecter writes that the Jameses offered the most probable solution yet for the Villisca murders.

In popular culture
The paranormal reality television series Ghost Adventures covered the story of the Villisca axe murders, in the episode "Villisca Axe Murder House".

The murders were described in Episode 19 “Cover the Mirrors” of the podcast “Scared to Death” on January 15, 2020. 

The paranormal reality television series Scariest Places on Earth covered the story of the Villisca axe murders and hosted a paranormal investigation on the property. 

The case was profiled on the television series Most Terrifying Places in America.

The murders were also described in Episode 16 of the podcast Lore, by Aaron Mahnke. As well as being referred to on the Lore tv show.

The murders were described live in Episode 168 of the podcast My Favorite Murder, by Karen Kilgariff.

The murders and purported paranormal activity was described in Episode 21 of the podcast And That's Why We Drink.

The Travel Channel's television show Destination Fear filmed at the location for the eighth episode of their third season.

The murders and an interview with caretaker Johnny Houser are featured in the first episode of the podcast “Haunted Road” with host Amy Bruni.  It was also investigated by Bruni, Adam Berry and psychic Chip Coffey for an episode of Kindred Spirits (TV series).

The murders were described in Episode 271 (October 17, 2021) on the podcast Morbid.

Ryan Bergara and Shane Madej of Buzzfeed Unsolved: Supernatural investigated the paranormal activity within the house in Season 7 Episode 2.

The murders were described in Episode 28, "The Villisca Murders" (June 7, 2021) of the Crimes of the Centuries podcast.

The story was also covered in Episode 3 of the podcast I Scream Social.

YouTuber Bailey Sarian featured the murders on an episode of her weekly series, Murder, Mystery & Makeup.

The murders were also covered in Episode 12 of the Will Continue To Monitor podcast. 

Youtubers Sam and Colby published a paranormal investigation video of the murders.

The murders were described in the episode Who Committed the 1912 Villisca Ax Murders? on the August 3, 2017 episode of the Stuff You Should Know podcast.

See also
Ardenwald axe murders, similar massacre in Oregon a year prior
Hinterkaifeck murders, similar massacre in Germany ten years later
Josiah B. and Sara Moore House
List of unsolved murders

References

External links

Official website of the Villisca Axe Murder House
</ref>
Villisca Axe Murders, 1912
"RAGBRAI Riders Visit Villisca Axe Murder House" KCRG-TV (Video)
Villisca Ax Murders Podcast. Stuff You Missed in History Class, October 27, 2014

1912 in Iowa
1912 murders in the United States
Axe murder
Crimes in Iowa
Deaths by stabbing in the United States
Family murders
June 1912 events
Mass murder in 1912
Mass murder in the United States
Montgomery County, Iowa
Murder in Iowa
Murdered American children
Stabbing attacks in the United States
Unsolved mass murders in the United States